Juan Manuel Bar (born 29 June 1987) is an Argentine handball player. He competed in the 2020 Summer Olympics.

References

External links
 
 
 

1987 births
Living people
Handball players at the 2020 Summer Olympics
Argentine male handball players
Olympic handball players of Argentina
21st-century Argentine people